Mosvik is a village in Inderøy municipality in Trøndelag county, Norway. The village is located on the western shore of the Trondheimsfjorden, just south of the Skarnsundet strait and the Skarnsund Bridge. Mosvik Church is located in the village. From 1901 until 2012, the village was the administrative centre of the old municipality of Mosvik.

References

Villages in Trøndelag
Inderøy